Rizvi College of Engineering is a private engineering college, located in the Bandra (west) suburb of Mumbai, in Maharashtra state of India. It was established in 1998, and is managed by the Rizvi Education Society. It is a Muslim religious minority college (i.e., half of all seats are reserved for students from the Muslim religious minority community). It is affiliated to the University of Mumbai (a public university funded by the state government of Maharashtra), is accredited by the All India Council for Technical Education (AICTE) of the Government of India, and is recognized by the Directorate of Technical Education (DTE) of the state government of Maharashtra.

It offers undergraduate education leading to the University of Mumbai's "Bachelor of Engineering" (B.E.) degree in any 1 of the following 6 disciplines: mechanical engineering, electronics engineering, computer engineering, biotechnology, civil engineering, and electronics and telecommunication engineering. The ordinary duration of these undergraduate courses is 4 years.

History
The college was established in the year 1998 by the Rizvi Education Society, which is a "Public Charitable Trust" established under the Societies Act 1950 and registered under the provisions of The Bombay Public Act, 1950. The Society started with the Rizvi College of Arts, Science and Commerce and Rizvi High School in the year 1985. It later established Rizvi College of Hotel Management & Catering Technology, Rizvi College of Engineering, Rizvi Law College, Rizvi College of Education and Rizvi College of Fashion Designing & Creative Arts. All these are located at Rizvi Educational Complex near Carter Road, Bandra (West), Mumbai.

Rizvi College of Engineering initially offered instruction leading to the University of Mumbai's Bachelor of Engineering degree (four-year duration) in 3 disciplines: civil engineering, electronics engineering, and mechanical engineering. The first batch of students graduated in the year 2002. New departments were subsequently started: electronics and telecommunication engineering in 2002 (first batch graduating in 2006), computer engineering in 2008 (first batch graduating in 2012), and biotechnology in 2012 (first batch to graduate in 2016). All departments offer degrees of the University of Mumbai.

Campus and location
The college is located near Carter Road, in the Bandra (west) suburb of Mumbai. The campus is an eight-storied building, in which the Rizvi College of Engineering occupies the bottom six floors and the Rizvi College of Architecture occupies the top two floors. (The administrative and other offices are separate for both the colleges. Except a few minor things like the elevator, there is hardly any sharing of facilities between the two colleges, as is required by rules governing colleges in India.)

Other institutes of the Rizvi Education Society (Rizvi College of Arts, Science and Commerce; Rizvi High School; Rizvi College of Hotel Management & Catering Technology; Rizvi Law College;  Rizvi College of Education; and Rizvi College of Fashion Designing & Creative Arts) are located nearby. Together, all these institutes form the "Rizvi Education Complex".

Admissions
The admissions to the undergraduate programs are made on the basis of scores of engineering entrance examination.

Admissions to half of all seats in each course are managed by the "Common Admission Process" (CAP) of the Directorate of Technical Education of the state government of Maharashtra. Various cast-, region- and gender-based reservations are implemented in these, as per the government rules.

Admissions to the other half of the seats are managed by the college administration. These include seats for the Muslim religious minority, as well as "management quota" in which admission may be obtained via a special donation to the college. Here, too, scores of the engineering entrance examination are used.

Among other requirements, a candidate has to secure at least 50% marks in aggregate of physics, chemistry and mathematics in the class 12 board examinations (or equivalent), as per the rules of the Directorate of Technical Education.

Departments

The college has 7 academic departments: one for each of the 6 engineering disciplines, and a department for "Applied Sciences and Humanities". Each is governed by a "Head of Department" (HoD).

Civil Engineering

It has the following laboratories:
 Concrete technology laboratory
 Fluid mechanics laboratory
 Applied hydraulics laboratory
 Foundation engineering laboratory
 Soil mechanics laboratory
 Environmental engineering laboratory

Electronics Engineering

It has the following laboratories:
 Control systems laboratory
 Digital communications laboratory
 Digital systems design laboratory
 Electronic circuit analysis laboratory
 Microprocessor and micro-controller laboratory
 Microwave devices and circuits laboratory
 Power electronics laboratory
 Robotics laboratory

Mechanical Engineering

It has the following laboratories:
 Heat and mass transfer laboratory
 Hydraulics machinery laboratory
 Mechanical vibrations laboratory
 Strength of materials laboratory
 Theory of machines laboratory
 Internal combustion engines laboratory
 Refrigeration and air-conditioning laboratory
 Workshop and machine-shop

Electronics and Telecommunication Engineering

It has the following laboratories:
 Antenna laboratory
 Digital electronics laboratory
 Digital communication laboratory
 Microprocessor laboratory
 Microwave and fiber optic laboratory
 Television laboratory

Computer Engineering

This department maintains the following laboratories:
 AutoCAD laboratory (used by the department of mechanical engineering)
 Data warehousing and mining laboratory
 Computer graphics laboratory
 Computer networks laboratory
 Server room

Biotechnology

Applied Sciences and Humanities

Library

The college library has around 26,000 books, periodicals, newspapers, CD-ROMs, journals, magazines & online journals. It possesses institutional membership of the Library of Indian Institute of Technology, Bombay.

The library has an "Open Access System" (OAS) where 3 dedicated computers allow the students and staff members to retrieve the bibliographic details of the documents to be located.

There are 2 reading rooms: one for students, and another one for staff members. Library timings may be extended before and during examinations, to assist students in studying.

Each student can apply for, and is then issued, two library cards, on which he/she can take books for "reference" (returning them on the same day) or for "issue" (returning them after maximum duration of 1 week). Like in most other libraries, a nominal fine is charged on defaulters, to ensure prompt return of all materials that may be issued.

Placements of graduating students
The "Training and Placement Cell" of the college handles placements of final year students. Some of the major companies in which students have been placed, are given below:

Gallery

References

External links

 Official website of the Rizvi College of Engineering.
 Official website of the University of Mumbai.
 Official website of the Directorate of Technical Education of Maharashtra state.
 Official website of the All India Council for Technical Education.

Engineering colleges in Mumbai
Universities and colleges in Mumbai
Affiliates of the University of Mumbai
Educational institutions established in 1998